The Monterrey Open is a professional women's tennis tournament played on outdoor hard courts. The event is affiliated with the Women's Tennis Association (WTA), and is part of the 250 series on the WTA Tour. From 2009 to 2013, the tournament was held in the Sierra Madre Tennis Club and since 2014 the tournament is currently held at the Club Sonoma.

Finals

Singles

Doubles

See also
 WTA 250 tournaments
 Monterrey Challenger

References

External links
Official website

 
WTA Tour
Hard court tennis tournaments
Tennis tournaments in Mexico
Sport in Monterrey
Recurring sporting events established in 2009